This is a list of schools found in the various departments of Honduras.

San Pedro Sula, Cortés
 Escuela Internacional Sampedrana
 Western International School
Aurora Bilingual School
 EuropaSchule
 Santa María del Valle
 Our Second Home
 Holy Family Bilingual School
 Seran Bilingual School
 Escuela e Instituto Bilingue Valle de Sula.

La Ceiba, Atlántida
La Ceiba Bilingual School
Mazapán School
Saint Theresa Bilingual School
Palmeras Bilingual School

Tegucigalpa, Francisco Morazán
 Academia Los Pinares
Shadai School
 American School of Tegucigalpa
Dowal School
 Lycée Franco-Hondurien
La Estancia School
Elvel School
Macris School
Centro Escolar Antares
Centro Escolar Aldebarán
 Nashville School Tegucigalpa
 Summer Hill School
 Skills World School
 DelCampo International School
 International School of Tegucigalpa 
 The Mayan School
 Instituto Evangelico Francisco G. Penzotti
 Instituto Evangélico Virginia Sapp
 Columbus American School
 Instituto Salesiano San Miguel
 England School

Valle de Ángeles
 Nashville School Valle de Angeles
 Liquidambar School

Olancho
 Centro Escolar Bilingue Santa Clara 
 Instituto Bilingue Santa Clara

See also

References

Honduras
 
Schools
Schools
Schools
Honduras